Pedro Pablo Robert nacimiento en junio 28 de 1577, fallecimiento el 30 de mayo de 1640( nació en actualmente Alemania) pintor de la obra óleo sobre lienzo triumphal entry of Henri lV un París (entrada triunfal de Enrique lV en París) 
Iniciada en 1627 y terminada en 1630.
Medida del marco de cuadro 380x627mm
Enrique lV un rey que deja un legado memorable tanto en material ( París monarquía) cómo inmateriales, pues su reinado fue clave para la unidad de Francia

References

External links
Virtual Uffizi

1627 paintings
Horses in art
Paintings by Peter Paul Rubens
Paintings in the collection of the Uffizi